The list of UCLA Anderson School of Management Alumni includes   graduates, professors and administrators affiliated with the UCLA Anderson School of Management, who are notable enough to have a Wikipedia article. .

Alumni

Advertising and marketing
Cathy Saidiner (MBA 1998)  – Managing Director Dove Worldwide and CEO, One Unilever, Ogilvy & Mather Advertising

Arts and entertainment
Jennifer Abbondanza (MBA 2006) – VP of Corporate Initiatives, Diversity NBCUniversal
Steve A. Bartels (Cert 1992) – CEO DefJam Records
Brian Becker (MBA 1982) – CEO of BASE Entertainment
Michael Burns (MBA 1992) – Vice Chairman, Lionsgate Entertainment
Andrew Campion (MBA 2003, BA 1993) - Chief Operating Officer, Nike, Inc.
Eric Doctorow (MBA 1977) – founder and CEO, Random Media
Eric Ellenbogen (MBA 1986) Co-Head, International TV & DreamWorks Classics
Brian Farrell (MBA 1978) – former CEO of THQ
Meyer Gottlieb (MBA 1964) – President, The Samuel Goldwyn Company
Paul Hanneman (MBA 1990) – Co-President, Twentieth Century Fox International
Michael Hopkins (MBA 2001) – Chairman, Sony Pictures Television
Mitchell Kupchak (MBA 1987) – General Manager, Los Angeles Lakers
Thad Levine (MBA 1999) – General Manager of the Minnesota Twins
Christine McCarthy (MBA 1981) – Senior Executive Vice President & Chief Financial Officer, The Walt Disney Co.
Alice Neuhauser (MBA 1994) – Manager, The Kushner-Locke Company
Brian O'Halloran (MBA 2002) – Senior Vice President and Assistant General Manager of Boston Red Sox
Kelly Perdew (MBA 1996) – Co-Founder and Managing General Partner, Moonshots Capital; winner, Donald Trump's The Apprentice 2 
Rose Catherine Pinkney (MBA 1988)-  Vice President, Development & Original Programming, TV Land
Rae Sanchini (MBA 1987) – President, Lightstorm Entertainment (Titanic)
Manjit Singh (MBA 1984) – President, Sony Pictures Home Entertainment
Erika Green Swafford (MBA 1999) – Writer, How to Get Away with Murder
Mark Zoradi (MBA 1980) – CEO, Cinemark

Banking and investments
George Benter (MBA 1964) – former President and COO, City National Bank
George Boutros (MBA 1986) – CEO, Qatalyst Partners
Peter H. Dailey (BS 1954) – Chairman Enniskerry, Financial, Ltd. and United States Ambassador to Ireland (1982–1984)
Laurence Fink (MBA 1976) – CEO and Chairman, BlackRock Financial Management Group
Bill Gross (MBA 1971) – CEO and Chairman, Alstor Bank of Commerce 
Benjamin Hong (MBA 1972) – former President and CEO, Nara Bank
Boyd Jefferies (BS 1953) – former Chairman and CEO, Jefferies & Company
Theresa Lang (MBA 1982) – former Sr. VP and Treasurer, Merrill Lynch
James F. Montgomery (BS 1957) – former CEO and Chairman, Great Western Bank
David Polak (MBA 1968) – Founder and former Chairman, NWQ Investment Management Co.
Robert S. Murley (MBA 1974), Chairman of the Investment Banking of Credit Suisse Securities, Chairman of the UCLA Anderson Board of Visitors.
Leslie Perkins (MBA 1983) – Managing Director, J.P. Morgan
Tom Schwartz (MBA 1983) – Managing Director, Goldman Sachs
David Shulman (MBA 1966) – former Managing Director, Lehman Brothers
Mark Tsesarsky (MBA 1986) – Managing Director, Citigroup
Thomas Wu (MBA 1975) – Chairman, Taishin International Bank
 Michael J. Berchtold (MBA 1987)- Managing Director, Head of Investment Banking of Asia Pacific Region of Morgan Stanley and later President of Asia Pacific Region of Morgan Stanley.

Billionaires
John Edward Anderson (BS 1940) – founder and former President, Topa Equities, Ltd.
Laurence Fink (MBA '76) - CEO and Chairman of BlackRock
Bill Gross (MBA 1971) – Portfolio Manager, Janus Global Unconstrained Bond Fund
Nobutada Saji (MS 1971) – Chairman of the Board, Suntory Limited

Consulting
Marshall Goldsmith (PhD 1977) – former Founding Director, Alliance for Strategic Leadership
 James Moffatt (MBA 1987) - CEO, Global Consulting, Deloitte Touche Tohmatsu Limited in the U.S.

Educators
William L. Ballhaus, CEO of Blackboard; former CEO of  SRA International
Aswath Damodaran (PhD 1985, MBA 1981) – position to Professor of Finance, New York University Stern School of Business
Arjay Miller (BS 1937) – former Dean, Stanford Graduate School of Business
Toby Moskowitz (PhD 1998) – Fama Family Chaired Professor of Finance, The University of Chicago Booth School of Business
Jake Neuberg (MBA 2002) – co-founder of Revolution Prep (with Ramit Varma)
Jacques Rojot (PhD 1976)  – former Dean of School of Management University of Paris-Sorbonne
Ramit Varma (MBA 2002) – co-founder of Revolution Prep (with Jake Neuberg)

Energy
Donald G. Castle (MBA 1970) – former CEO, Chevron Corporation

Food and beverage
John Harris (MBA 1974) – former Chairman and CEO, Nestlé Waters
Richard Herzer (BS 1958) – former CEO, International House of Pancakes
Carl Karcher (EP 1982) – former President, CKE Restaurants
Sharon Rothstein (MBA 1984) – Global CMO, Starbucks

Government
Roel Campos (MS 1972) – Partner, Chair of SEC enforcement Defense Practice, Hughes Hubbard & Reed LLP
Nadya Chinoy Dabby (MBA 2006) – Assistant Deputy Secretary, Department of Education Office of Innovation and Improvement
Jim Matheson (MBA 1987) – CEO, NRECA; Served as a U.S. Representative in congress from Utah from 2001 to 2015.
Story Musgrave (MBA 1959) – Astronaut, NASA
Giora Romm MBA 1982 – former Director of Ministry of National Infrastructure
Nigel Huddleston (MBA 1998) – Member of Parliament, Mid Worcestershire
William A. Kowba (MBA 1987) - Rear Admiral (Retired) U.S. Navy.  Served as commanding officer of the U.S. Navy Fleet and Industrial Supply Center (FISC)San Diego.  Also served as Superintendent of the San Diego (California) Unified School Board.

Healthcare
Dr. Susan Love (MBA 1998) – President, Dr. Susan Love Research Foundation
Martine Rothblatt (MBA 1981) – Chairman and CEO, United Therapeutics
Lezlee Westine (MBA 1985) – President and Chief Executive, Personal Care Products Council
R. David Yost (MBA 1970) – former President and CEO, AmerisourceBergen
Jennifer Taubert (MBA 1987) - Executive Vice President, Worldwide Chairman, Pharmaceuticals, Johnson & Johnson. Member Johnson & Johnson Executive Committee.

High tech
Susan Baumgarten (MBA 1979) – former President, Raytheon International
Robert N. Brisco (MBA 1987) – President and CEO, Internet Brands
Lisa Brummel (MBA 1989) – Board Member, Laird Norton Wealth Management; Co-Owner Seattle Storm
Frank T. Cary (BS 1943) – former Chairman and CEO, IBM
Martin Ford, author of Rise of the Robots: Technology and the Threat of a Jobless Future, winner of  2015 Financial Times and McKinsey Business Book of the Year Award.
Chuck Harrington (MBA 1987) –  CEO and Chairman, Parsons
Zuisho Hayashi (MBA 1962) – President, Humax
Jeffrey O. Henley (MBA 1967) – Executive Vice President and CFO Oracle
Ravi Jacob (MBA 1984) – VP and Treasurer, Intel
Aiman Ezzat (MBA 1991) - CEO of Capgemini
Akinobu Kanasugi (MBA 1967) – former President, NEC Corp. 
Guy Kawasaki (MBA 1979) – author, former Chief Evangelist of Apple 
Fumio Nagase (MBA 1983) – Group CEO, Imagica Corp.
Richard G. Newman – (EP 1976) – former Chairman and CEO, AECOM
Sunil Rajaraman (MBA 2008) – CEO and co-founder of scripted.com
Dan Sanker  (MBA 1992) – President/Chief Executive Officer, CaseStack
Marius Vassiliou (MBA 1991) – Analyst and Project Leader, Institute for Defense Analyses
Stanley Wainer (BS 1950) – former Chairman and CEO, Wyle Laboratories
Susan Wojcicki (MBA 1998) – CEO, YouTube.

Hospitality
Stephen Bollenbach (BS 1965) – non executive chairman, KB Home; Member of Board of Directors Time Warner
Yuji Tsutsumi (BS 1965) – Chairman & CEO, Yokohama Grand InterContinental Hotel Co., Ltd.; Board Advisor, UCLA Terasaki Center for Japanese Studies

Industrials
John E. Parker (BS 1950) – President, Parker Industries; Founder of Parker Career Management Center and Entrepreneurs Hall, UCLA Anderson School of Management

Not-for-profit
Steven Hilton (MBA 1989) – Chairman, President and CEO, Conrad N. Hilton Foundation
Torie Osborn (MBA 1984) – former Executive Director, Los Angeles Gay and Lesbian Center; National Gay and Lesbian Task Force, Liberty Hill Foundation

Real estate

Hoyt S. Pardee (BS 1941) – Founder, Pardee Homes former Chairman, Weyerhaeuser Mortgage Co.
Bernardo Quintana (MA 1968) – founder, former Chairman, Empresas ICA
 Michael J. Escalante (MBA 1987) - CEO, Griffin Capital Essential Asset REIT

Retail
Susan Feldman (MBA 1983) – Co-founder, One Kings Lane (with Alison Pincus)
Brian Cornell (MBA 1991) – Chairman and CEO, Target Corporation. Non-executive chairman, Yum! Brands.
Alison Pincus (MBA 2002) – Co-founder, One Kings Lane (with Susan Feldman)
Scot Rank (MBA 1989) – CEO and President, Walmart de México y Centroamérica
Nobutada Saji (MS 1971) – Chief Executive Suntory Limited

Transportation
Donald Craib (BS 1949) – Chairman and CEO Allstate Insurance
James Farley, Jr. (MBA 1990) – Chief Operating Officer Ford Motor Company
Craig Kreeger (MBA 1985) – CEO, Virgin Atlantic
Ronald Nelson (MBA 1976) -Executive Chairman, Avis Budget Group; Independent Director, ZipCar.

Venture capital and private equity
Gill Cogan (MBA 1977) – general partner, Lightspeed Venture Partners
B. Kipling Hagopian (MBA 1966) – Co-Founder, Brentwood Associates; Managing Director, Apple Oaks Partners, LLC.; Chairman and President, Segue Productions.
Timothy Pennington (MBA 1966) – Co-founder, general partner Brentwood Associates; Founding Member, UCLA Anderson School of Management
Patricia L. Anslinger (MBA 1987) - Founder, partner, McKinsey Private Equity.

Faculty
Paul Habibi, lecturer in real estate

References

External links 
UCLA Anderson School of Management website
UCLA Anderson School of Management Alumni Association website

Anderson School of Management people
UCLA Anderson School of Management people
Anderson School of Management people